Jakov Surać (born 12 February 1975) is a Croatian former professional footballer who played as a midfielder. In July 2014 he set a record of being the oldest player ever to play in a Croatian First Football League match. Surać is also the most capped played in the history of the Croatian First Football League.

References

External links

1975 births
Living people
Sportspeople from Zadar
Association football midfielders
Croatian footballers
Croatia youth international footballers
NK Zadar players
NK Osijek players
NK Zagreb players
Croatian Football League players